Foustown is an unincorporated community in West Manchester Township, York County, Pennsylvania, 
United States.

Foustown is located at  (39.9950974, -76.7716341). It lies 502 feet (153 m) above sea level.

References 

Unincorporated communities in York County, Pennsylvania
Unincorporated communities in Pennsylvania